The Secretary of State for Social Security and Pensions (SESSP) is a senior minister of the Government of Spain, under the authority of the Social Security Minister, responsible for the direction and guardianship of the managing agencies and common services of the Social Security; the impulse, direction and economic and financial analysis of the Social Security System; as well as the planning and supervision of the management of the collaborating entities of the Social Security (mutuals of work accidents, collaborating companies and labor foundations) complementary to the Social Security action.

As of 2021, the Secretariat of State had a budget of €42.2 billion. It should be added that, the SESS supervises the Social Security Administration, an independent administration with its own budget that in 2021 was up to €176.2 billion.

Likewise, it is also in charge of proposing and giving support, in the performance of its functions, to the  Data Protection Officer of the Social Security, an official of the Spanish Data Protection Agency.

History 
The Office of the Secretary of State for Social Security was created in October 1978, a few months before the approval of the Constitution. Until then, there were lower-level bodies such as the Undersecretariat for Social Security, and the government of that time wanted to give greater importance to this system by creating this position.

To this top body was assigned the main managing agencies of the Social Security and was structured through three governing bodies: the Directorate-General for the Legal Regime of Social Security, the Directorate-General for the Economic Regime of Social Security and the Deputy Directorate-General for Coordination. In 1981, all the economic, budgetary, inspection and management control competencies of all the managing agencies and common services of the Social Security were transferred to it through the incorporation into its structure of the Office of the Comptroller General of the Social Security.

The temporary merger of the Ministries of Labour and Health in 1981 gave rise to the Ministry of Labour, Health and Social Security, incorporating for the first time the competencies on Social Security to Labour and confirming this intention at the end of this year when they were once again separated, the Labour Ministry acquired denomination of "Labour and Social Security". As a result, the secretariat of state was degraded to the rank of undersecretariat, first as Undersecretariat for Social Security and then as General Secretariat for Social Security.

The new conservative government of 1996 gave again to the Social Security Affairs the rank of Secretariat of State, although removing the prominence that it had in the denomination of the ministry, that was called Ministry of Labour and Social Affairs. It was at this time that the current structure was adopted with the creation of the DGOSS. The Legal Service of the Social Security Administration was created on May 12, 2000. The Social Security Information Technology Department has been under the responsibility of the Secretary of State since 2004.

In January 2020 a major shift happened when a Ministry for the Social Security was created, named Ministry of Inclusion, Social Security and Migration. This department assumed all the powers and bodies of the Ministry of Labour relating social security and migration affairs.

Structure 

The SESS is composed by three main departments and a personal cabinet to the Secretary of State:

 The Directorate-General for Social Security Management (DGOSS).
 It is responsible for, among other things, carrying out the legal, economic and financial organisation of the Social Security, planning and drafting of economic-financial and demographic studies, drawing up preliminary draft Social Security budgets, economic and budgetary oversight of the Managing Agencies and Common Services, and the knowledge and evaluation of the management and economic-financial situation of the Mutual Societies for Work-Related Injuries and Occupational Diseases.
 The Office of the Comptroller General of the Social Security.
 It carries out the internal control of Social Security. It is directly responsible to the Office of the General Comptroller of the State.
 The Legal Service of the Social Security Administration.
 It exercises the functions and competencies related to representation and defence in trials of the Management Agencies and Common Services of the Social Security

The Secretariat of State for Social Security is the government department responsible for supervise the following agencies:

 The National Social Security Institute.
 The Maritime Social Institute.
 The Social Security Treasury General.
 The Social Security IT Department.

List of Secretaries
 Luis Gámir (1978–1979)
 José Barea Tejeiro (1980–1981)
 José Antonio Sánchez Velayos (1981)
 Luis García de Blas (1982–1986)
 Adolfo Jiménez Fernández (1986–1996)
 Juan Carlos Aparicio (1996–2000)
 Gerardo Camps Devesa (2000–2003)
 Fernando Castelló (2003–2004)
 Octavio Granado (2004–2011)
 Tomás Burgos Gallego (2011–2018)
 Octavio Granado (2018–2020)
 Israel Arroyo Martínez (2020–present)

References

Secretaries of State of Spain
Social security in Spain
Welfare in Spain